Jim Rattray (born 22 August 1929) is a former  Australian rules footballer who played with Hawthorn in the Victorian Football League (VFL).

Notes

External links 

Living people
1929 births
Australian rules footballers from Victoria (Australia)
Hawthorn Football Club players